Ethel Ann Murray (born August 11, 1932) is an American politician. She was a member of the Maryland House of Delegates, representing District 35B from 1983 to 1994.

Early life
Ethel Ann Murray was born on August 11, 1932, in The Bronx, New York City. She attended Catherine McAuley Academy in Brooklyn. She also attended the University of Maryland, Loyola College and Cecil Community College.

Career
Murray served as a member of the Maryland House of Delegates, representing District 35B from 1983 to 1994. She was elected as a Democrat. She ran again in 1994, but lost the election to David D. Rudolph.

References

Living people
1932 births
Politicians from the Bronx
Democratic Party members of the Maryland House of Delegates
20th-century American politicians